The 2019 Masters Tournament was the 83rd edition of the Masters Tournament and the first of golf's four major championships in 2019, held between April 11 and 14 at Augusta National Golf Club in Augusta, Georgia.

Tiger Woods won his fifth Green Jacket, and fifteenth major, by one stroke ahead of three runners-up. It left him one shy of Jack Nicklaus's record six Masters wins, and three short of his record eighteen major wins. At age 43, he became the eleventh oldest player to win a major, and the second oldest Masters winner, again only bettered by Nicklaus who won at age 46. It was 11 years after his last major win, the 2008 U.S. Open, and 14 years since his last Masters win beating the previous record of 13 years held by Gary Player. Due to the high profile of Woods, and his storied fall from the top of the game due to personal issues and injuries, the victory generated a large  amount of publicity around the world, and is regarded as one of the great sporting comebacks.

Woods only emerged to lead the tournament in the final round, when Francesco Molinari, who had been leading the tournament, hit his ball into the water on the 12th hole and then again on the 15th after hitting a tree. It was the first time Woods won a major when not leading after the 54th hole.

Most of the media, and the Las Vegas bookmakers, placed Rory McIlroy, Justin Rose, and Dustin Johnson the pre-tournament favorites. McIlroy, the only player to finish in the top ten in the previous five Masters, came into the tournament as the Players champion and with seven consecutive top-10 PGA Tour finishes, but could only finish tied for 21st. Two-time runner-up Rose came in as world number one, but missed the cut. Johnson, who came in as world number two, and had a dominant win in the 2019 WGC-Mexico Championship, finished tied for second.

A Masters record 65 players made the cut, including three amateurs. The leading amateur, and winner of the Silver Cup, was Norwegian Viktor Hovland who had qualified as the U.S. Amateur champion. He finished tied for 32nd at 3-under-par.

It was also the first time three players had shot 64 or better in a single round at the Masters, as Patrick Cantlay, Tony Finau, and Webb Simpson all shot 64 in the third round. This was partly attributed by the media to the soft conditions, lack of wind and accessible pin positions.

Course

Field
The Masters has the smallest field of the four major championships. Officially, the Masters remains an invitation event, but there is a set of qualifying criteria that determines who is included in the field. Each player is classified according to the first category by which he qualified, with other categories in which he qualified shown in parentheses.

Golfers who qualify based solely on their performance in amateur tournaments (categories 6–10) must remain amateurs on the starting day of the tournament to be eligible to play.

1. Past Masters Champions
Ángel Cabrera, Fred Couples, Sergio García (17,18), Trevor Immelman, Zach Johnson (3), Bernhard Langer, Sandy Lyle, Phil Mickelson (15,16,17,18), Larry Mize, José María Olazábal, Patrick Reed (11,12,16,17,18), Charl Schwartzel, Adam Scott (14,17,18), Vijay Singh, Jordan Spieth (2,3,11,17,18), Bubba Watson (11,15,16,17,18), Mike Weir, Danny Willett, Tiger Woods (14,15,16,17,18), Ian Woosnam

Past champions who did not play: Tommy Aaron, Jack Burke Jr., Charles Coody, Ben Crenshaw, Nick Faldo, Raymond Floyd, Bob Goalby, Jack Nicklaus, Mark O'Meara, Gary Player, Craig Stadler, Tom Watson, Fuzzy Zoeller.

2. Last five U.S. Open Champions
Dustin Johnson (11,12,15,16,17,18), Martin Kaymer, Brooks Koepka (4,12,14,15,16,17,18)

3. Last five Open Champions
Rory McIlroy (4,5,11,13,15,16,17,18), Francesco Molinari (13,15,16,17,18), Henrik Stenson (11,17,18)

4. Last five PGA Champions
Jason Day (5,15,16,17,18), Justin Thomas (15,16,17,18), Jimmy Walker

5. Last three winners of The Players Championship
Kim Si-woo, Webb Simpson (15,16,17,18)

6. Top two finishers in the 2018 U.S. Amateur
Devon Bling (a), Viktor Hovland (a)

7. Winner of the 2018 Amateur Championship
Jovan Rebula (a)

8. Winner of the 2018 Asia-Pacific Amateur Championship
Takumi Kanaya (a)

9. Winner of the 2018 U.S. Mid-Amateur
Kevin O'Connell (a)

10. Winner of the 2019 Latin America Amateur Championship
Álvaro Ortiz (a)

11. The top 12 finishers and ties in the 2018 Masters Tournament
Tony Finau (16,17,18), Rickie Fowler (15,16,17,18), Charley Hoffman, Marc Leishman (15,16,17,18), Louis Oosthuizen (17,18), Jon Rahm (14,16,17,18), Justin Rose (13,15,16,17,18), Cameron Smith (16,17,18)

12. Top 4 finishers and ties in the 2018 U.S. Open
Tommy Fleetwood (16,17,18)

13. Top 4 finishers and ties in the 2018 Open Championship
Kevin Kisner (15,17,18), Xander Schauffele (15,16,17,18)

14. Top 4 finishers and ties in the 2018 PGA Championship
Stewart Cink

15. Winners of PGA Tour events that award a full-point allocation for the FedEx Cup, between the 2018 Masters Tournament and the 2019 Masters Tournament
Keegan Bradley (16,17,18), Paul Casey (16,17,18), Corey Conners, Bryson DeChambeau (16,17,18), J. B. Holmes (18), Charles Howell III (18), Michael Kim, Satoshi Kodaira (17), Matt Kuchar (17,18), Andrew Landry, Adam Long, Keith Mitchell, Kevin Na (16,17), Brandt Snedeker (17,18), Kevin Tway, Aaron Wise (16)

16. All players qualifying for the 2018 edition of The Tour Championship
Patrick Cantlay (17,18), Billy Horschel (17,18), Patton Kizzire, Hideki Matsuyama (17,18), Kyle Stanley (17,18), Gary Woodland (17,18)

17. Top 50 on the final 2018 Official World Golf Ranking list
Kiradech Aphibarnrat (18), Lucas Bjerregaard (18), Rafa Cabrera-Bello (18), Matt Fitzpatrick (18), Branden Grace (18), Emiliano Grillo, Tyrrell Hatton (18), Li Haotong (18), Alex Norén (18), Thorbjørn Olesen, Eddie Pepperell (18), Ian Poulter (18), Matt Wallace (18)

18. Top 50 on the Official World Golf Ranking list on April 1, 2019
Justin Harding, Shane Lowry

19. International invitees
Shugo Imahira

Par 3 contest
Wednesday, April 10, 2019

Matt Wallace won the par-3 contest on the third playoff hole against Sandy Lyle after both players finished with a score of 22 (−5). Wallace made a hole-in-one on the 8th hole, while three other aces were recorded by Mark O'Meara, Shane Lowry, and amateur Devon Bling. Wallace missed the 36-hole cut by five strokes.

Weather

Thursday: Partly cloudy. High of 84 °F/29 °C. Wind SE 10-15 mph.

Friday: Mostly cloudy with scattered showers. High of 84 °F/29 °C. Wind SSE 5-10 mph. Play was suspended at 5:05 p.m. due to dangerous weather and resumed at 5:34 p.m., a delay of 29 minutes.

Saturday: Mostly cloudy. High of 85 °F/29 °C. Wind SE 5-10 mph.

Sunday: Play began at 7:30 a.m. due to threat of thunderstorms. Cloudy with scattered showers. High of 80 °F/27 °C. Wind SSE 15-20 mph, with gusts to 25 mph.

Round summaries

First round
Thursday, April 11, 2019

Bryson DeChambeau and reigning PGA Championship and U.S. Open champion Brooks Koepka tied for the lead at 66 (−6). DeChambeau's round included six birdies in his final seven holes. One stroke behind was three-time Masters champion Phil Mickelson with world number two Dustin Johnson and Ian Poulter two behind. Ten players were tied for 11th place at 70 (−2), including two of the pre-tournament favorites, Rickie Fowler and Tiger Woods. Defending champion Patrick Reed opened with 73 (+1).

Second round
Friday, April 12, 2019

Five players, all major champions, shared the lead at the end of the second day. First-round co-leader Brooks Koepka struggled early with two bogeys and a double, but recovered with three birdies to score 71 (−1). Jason Day and Francesco Molinari both scored 67 (−5), while Louis Oosthuizen shot the second best round of the day, 66 (−6). 2013 champion Adam Scott shot a 68 (−4) that included an eagle on the par-5 15th. In the group one back were Dustin Johnson, Tiger Woods, and Xander Schauffele who shot a 65 (−7), the lowest round of the first two days. Woods, seeking his first major since the 2008 U.S. Open, made two front-nine bogeys in a round of 68 (−4). The other first round co-leader, Bryson DeChambeau, struggled with a 75 (+3) while Phil Mickelson followed up his opening round 67 (−5) with a 73 (+1).			

There was a 29-minute delay during the afternoon because of thunderstorms in the area. Players remained on the course during the delay. The Masters has a "10 shot rule" whereby all players within 10 shots of the leaders make the 36-hole cut. With the leaders on 137 (−7) the cut was at 147 (+3). 65 players made the cut, the most since the cut was introduced in 1957. Four amateurs made the cut, the most since 1999. World number one Justin Rose was among the players to miss the cut, his first missed cut in his 14th appearance. Also missing the cut was 1991 Masters Champion Ian Woosnam, who announced his retirement as an active Masters competitor shortly after completion of play.
 

Amateurs: Hovland (−1), Ortiz (E), Bling (+3), Kanaya (+3), O'Connell (+4), Rebula (+8)

Third round
Saturday, April 13, 2019

Francesco Molinari, part of a five-way tie for the lead at the start of the round, made four straight birdies from holes 12 to 15 on his way to a round of 66 (−6) and a two-shot lead after 54 holes. Tony Finau began his round with three straight birdies and made an eagle at the par-5 8th hole, tying the Masters record with 30 on the front-nine. He ended up with a round of 64 (−8), one off the course record, to jump into a tie for second. Four-time Masters champion Tiger Woods was one-over through 5 holes before birdieing 6 to 8, and after three more birdies on the back-nine shot 67 (−5) to join Finau at 11 under par.			

Webb Simpson and Patrick Cantlay also shot 64, the first time in Masters history three rounds of 64 or better were shot on the same day. The field combined to shoot 80-under for the round, the lowest in tournament history.

Amateurs: Hovland (−2), Kanaya (−1), Ortiz (+1), Bling (+2)

Final round
Sunday, April 14, 2019

Summary
Due to the threat of thunderstorms forecast for the final day, the players were grouped into threesomes with tee times at 7:30 a.m. EDT off the first and tenth tees; the leaders teed off at 9:20 a.m.

Francesco Molinari held the lead throughout the first eleven holes before his tee shot at No. 12 came up well short and rolled back into Rae's Creek, leading to a double bogey and a tie with Tiger Woods at 11 under par. As the final threesome played No. 15, Molinari, Woods, Xander Schauffele, Dustin Johnson and Brooks Koepka were tied at −12, but none of the latter three recorded another birdie and Molinari hit into the water again at the 15th before Woods birdied the hole. Woods doubled his advantage at 16, after his tee shot came within mere inches of going in before stopping three feet away from the cup, and made a tap-in par at 17. Needing only a bogey at the 18th to clinch the tournament, Woods chipped on and two-putted for the 5 and a 2-under-par 70 for the win. It was the first time that Woods had won a major championship when he was trailing after 54 holes.			

Woods became the fifth player to have a gap of over a decade between major wins.  The others were Henry Cotton, Julius Boros, Hale Irwin and Ben Crenshaw.

Timeline of key events
12.13pm

Most of the leaders entered Amen corner in or around par for the round. Patrick Cantlay scored 3 under par through the first eleven holes to move up the leaderboard. Some commentators were suggesting Francesco Molinari was showing the same composure that enabled him to win the 2018 Open Championship.

Leaderboard: −13: Molinari (10); −11: Koepka (10), Woods (10); −10: Cantlay (12), Schauffele (12), Poulter (10), Finau (10)

12.31pm:

Brooks Koepka and Ian Poulter both find Rae's Creek on the 12th to score double bogeys. After a birdie on the 15th, backing up birdies on the 2nd, 7th, 8th, and 13th, Jason Day reaches 10 under par.

12.39pm:

Bubba Watson makes an eagle on the 15th, to back up birdies on the 13th and 14th and charge up the leaderboard.

12.47pm:

The leading group tee up on the par 3 12th, with the wind swirling. Francesco Molinari targets the flag and lands on the false front to roll back into Rae's Creek. Tiger Woods hits the centre of the green, after deciding not to go for the flag. Tony Finau goes for the flag, finding Rae's Creek as well. Molinari and Finau, like Koepka and Poulter before them, end up with a double bogey on the 12th, severely hurting their chances of victory.

 Leaderboard: −11: Schauffele (13), Molinari (12), Woods (12); −10: Day (16), Watson (16), Cantlay (14)

1.00pm:

Brooks Koepka bounces back from his double bogey on 12, to eagle the 13th. Jon Rahm birdies the 16th to go four under for the round, and 10 under overall. Xander Schuffele birdies the 14th, and Patrick Cantlay eagles the 15th to move into joint lead.

 Leaderboard: −12: Cantlay (15), Schauffele (14); −11: Koepka (13), Molinari (12), Woods (12); −10: Day (17), Rahm (16)

1.03pm:

Viktor Hovland of Norway wins the Silver Cup for low amateur. Hovland shot 71 to end the week at −3, one shot ahead of Mexican Alvaro Ortiz.

1.07pm:

Tiger Woods and Francesco Molinari birdie the 13th to move into a share of the lead, whilst Patrick Cantlay bogeys the 16th to move out of the leading pack.

 Leaderboard: −12: Schauffele (14), Molinari (13), Woods (13); −11: Cantlay (16), Koepka (13)

1.18pm:

Jason Day birdies the last to finish with a 67, −11 overall, to set the clubhouse lead

1.33pm:

Dustin Johnson birdies the 17th, to back up birdies on the 13th, 15th and 16th and join the leaders at 12 under par. Rickie Fowler also birdies the 17th, to back up birdies on the 13th, 14th and 15th and sit one shot behind.

 Leaderboard: −12: D Johnson (17), Schauffele (16), Koepka (15), Molinari (14), Woods (14); −11: Day (F), Fowler (17)

1.46pm:

Francesco Molinari drives into the trees on the 15th, and follows up with a misplaced lay-up. Playing from a tricky angle he hits an overhanging branch and his ball lands the pond guarding the front of the green. He ends up with a double bogey. Tiger Woods makes birdie to take sole lead of the tournament.

 Leaderboard: −13: Woods (15); −12: D Johnson (F), Schauffele (16), Koepka (16)

2.22pm:

After a birdie on the 16th, and a par on the 17th, Tiger Woods heads to the 18th knowing a bogey is all he needs to win his 5th Masters.

 Leaderboard: −14: Woods (17); −12: D Johnson (F), Schauffele (F), Koepka (F)

2.29pm:

Tiger Woods bogeys the 18th, to win the Masters by one shot.

Final leaderboard

Hole by hole scorecard progression

Cumulative tournament scores, relative to par
{|class="wikitable" span = 50 style="font-size:85%;
|-
|style="background: Red;" width=10|
|Eagle
|style="background: Pink;" width=10|
|Birdie
|style="background: PaleGreen;" width=10|
|Bogey
|style="background: Green;" width=10|
|Double bogey
|}

Aftermath

Reaction from Woods
As is traditional, Woods was interviewed in Butler Cabin, where he discussed his victory:

I'm a little hoarse from yelling. I was just trying to plot my way round. Then all of a sudden I had the lead. When I tapped the putt in, I don't know what I did. I know I screamed. And to have my kids there ... it's come full circle. In 1997 my dad was here. Now I'm the dad.

It's overwhelming, because of what has transpired. Last year I was just very lucky to be playing again. I missed a couple of years of playing this great tournament. And to now be the champion ... what, is it 22 years? It's a long time! It's unreal. My mom was here, she was here in 97 as well. I'm kind of at a loss for words. This is up there. It's one of the hardest I've ever had to win. I was close last year in the majors. I learned from those, and was able to seal the deal today.

References

External links

Coverage on the PGA Tour's official site
Coverage on the European Tour's official site
Coverage from the PGA of America

2019
2019 in golf
2019 in American sports
2019 in sports in Georgia (U.S. state)
April 2019 sports events in the United States